Stadia was a town of ancient Caria. It became a bishopric; no longer the seat of a residential bishop, it remains a titular see of the Roman Catholic Church.

Its site is located near Datça, Asiatic Turkey.

References

Populated places in ancient Caria
Former populated places in Turkey
Ancient Greek archaeological sites in Turkey
Catholic titular sees in Asia
Roman towns and cities in Turkey
Populated places of the Byzantine Empire
History of Muğla Province